The 1992 Christchurch mayoral election was part of the New Zealand local elections held that same year. In 1992, election were held for the Mayor of Christchurch plus other local government positions. The polling was conducted using the standard first-past-the-post electoral method.

Background
Mayor Vicki Buck was decisively re-elected for a second term after facing no serious contenders. She was opposed by mainly minor party candidates, her two closest polling opponents were Ken Ellis and James Daniels the hosts of the morning show on local radio station More FM.

Results
The following table gives the election results:

Ward results
Candidates were also elected from wards to the Christchurch City Council.

References

Mayoral elections in Christchurch
1992 elections in New Zealand
Politics of Christchurch
October 1992 events in New Zealand
1990s in Christchurch